Herbert Lawford defeated Ernest Lewis 6–2, 6–3, 2–6, 4–6, 6–4 in the All Comers' Final, but the reigning champion William Renshaw defeated Lawford 6–0, 5–7, 6–3, 6–4 in the challenge round to win the gentlemen's singles tennis title at the 1886 Wimbledon Championships for a record sixth consecutive year.

Draw

Challenge round

All comers' finals

Top half

Bottom half

References

External links

Gentlemen's Singles
Wimbledon Championship by year – Men's singles